Srirasthu Subhamasthu is a 1981 Indian Telugu-language film starring Chiranjeevi,Saritha.

Cast

Soundtrack

References

External links 
 

1981 films
1980s Telugu-language films
Films scored by J. V. Raghavulu